Metz is an unincorporated community in Marion County, West Virginia, United States. Metz had a post office, which closed on August 27, 2011.

History

Metz was founded by Jacob Metz in the early 1800s, well before the state of West Virginia seceded from the Confederacy.  The village of Metz was first known as "Bee Hive Station", because Jacob kept many bee hives.  In 1850, representatives of the Baltimore & Ohio Railroad approached Jacob about buying land for a needed rights-of-way.  Jacob agreed to give them the land providing they build a station and name it for him.  Metz Crossing was shortened to just "Metz" and remains so even today.

Climate
The climate in this area is characterized by relatively high temperatures and evenly distributed precipitation throughout the year.  According to the Köppen Climate Classification system, Metz has a Humid subtropical climate, abbreviated "Cfa" on climate maps.

References

Unincorporated communities in Marion County, West Virginia
Unincorporated communities in West Virginia